Lee Ki-hyuk is a South Korean actor, model and director. He is known for his roles in dramas such as Your Honor, Wok of Love and Sweet Home. He also appeared in movies A Better Tomorrow, Temptation of Wolves and Glass Garden.

Filmography

Television series

Film

References

External links
 
 

1985 births
Living people
South Korean male models
21st-century South Korean male actors
South Korean male film actors
South Korean male television actors